Noima (Greek: Νόημα) is the title of the seventh studio album by the popular Greek artist Peggy Zina, released in 2005 by Minos EMI. The entire album was written, composed and produced by Giorgos Theofanous.

Track listing
"Ola" (Όλα; Everything) - 3:42
"Noima" (Νόημα; Meaning) - 4:45
"Anipomono" (Ανυπομονώ; I Am Impatient ) - 4:13
"Mi Rotate" (Μη ρωτάτε; Don't Ask) - 4:34
"Ena Simadi" (Ένα σημάδι; A Sign) - 4:10
"Sou T' Orkizomai" (Σου τ' ορκίζομαι; I Swear To You) - 3:44
"Krima" (Κρίμα; Pity) - 3:39
"Svise Tin Fotia" (Σβήσε τη φωτιά; Put The Fire Out) - 3:46
"Metaniono" (Μετανιώνω; I Regret) - 3:14
"Gia Dio Matia" (Για δύο μάτια; For Two eyes) - 4:03
"Meine Akoma Ligo" (Μείνε ακόμα λίγο; Stay A Little More) - 4:06
"Noima" (Music Video) - 4:45

Album Covers
The album was unique in that it was released with four different covers featuring Zina with her eyes open, wearing Aviator style sunglasses, wearing a tiara, and with her eyes closed and hair flowing across her face.

Chart performance
The album appeared for 26 weeks in the Greek Albums Chart peaking at number 1.

References

Peggy Zina albums
Greek-language albums
2005 albums
Minos EMI albums